Dr. Meher Taj Roghani (born 14 April 1942) is a Pakistani politician hailing from Mardan, and is currently serving as a Pakistan Tehreek-e-Insaf Senator for Khyber Pakthunkhwa. Roghani served as Deputy Speaker of the 10th Khyber Pakhtunkhwa Assembly. She also served as a member and Committee Chairperson of the different committees. She is also served as Minister for Health and Special Advisor to the Chief Minister of Khyber Pakhtunkhwa on Social Welfare and Women's Empowerment. She is the first women Deputy Speaker of the Khyber Pakhtunkhwa Assembly

Education and career
Dr. Roghani holds the degrees of MBBS from Pakistan, DCH from Glasgow, FCPS (Hons) from Pakistan and MRCP from Ireland.

References

1942 births
Living people
Khyber Pakhtunkhwa MPAs 2013–2018
Women members of the Provincial Assembly of Khyber Pakhtunkhwa
People from Mardan District
Pakistan Tehreek-e-Insaf MPAs (Khyber Pakhtunkhwa)
Deputy Speakers of the Provincial Assembly of Khyber Pakhtunkhwa
Women legislative deputy speakers
21st-century Pakistani women politicians